Coral is a type of marine animal.

Coral may also refer to:
Precious coral, a red or pink gem made from the skeleton of a coral species
Coral (color), several colors similar to that of the gem
Coral (name), a given name
Coral snake, a type of a venomous snake found in the Americas

Places

Australia
Coral Sea, a region of the north-east coast of Australia

United States
Coral, Illinois, an unincorporated community
Coral City, Wisconsin, an unincorporated community

Entertainment and media
The Coral, a British band
The Coral (album), a 2002 album by the band
Coral Pictures, a Radio Caracas Televisión subsidiary based in Miami, Florida
Coral Records, a Decca Records subsidiary
Coral Smith (born 1979), American reality television personality known as a cast member on MTV's The Real World: Back to New York
Coral, a character in the film Finding Nemo

Computing
CORAL 66 programming language, a block-structured programming language for real-time systems
Coral Consortium, a cross-industry group to promote interoperability between digital rights management (DRM) technologies used in the consumer media market

Other uses
 Coral (cypher machine), a Japanese WWII naval cypher
Coral beer, a lager from Madeira, Portugal
 Coral (bookmaker), a chain of betting shops in the UK
Coral Reef Alliance, a non-profit organization
Coral, the unfertilized eggs of a scallop, which turn a reddish color when cooked
MV Coral, a cruise ship operated by Louis Cruises
Windtech Coral, a Spanish paraglider design

See also
Corail (disambiguation)
Corral (disambiguation)
Koral (disambiguation)
Korall, a Russian cheese